The Member of Parliament for Kensington and Chelsea, The Rt. Hon Alan Clark (Conservative), died of a brain tumour on 5 September 1999.

This was the first safe Conservative seat to have a by-election in the 1997–2001 UK Parliament. There was immediate speculation that Michael Portillo, the most high-profile casualty of the 1997 general election, would use it to return to frontline politics. Portillo immediately confirmed his interest in the seat, but was then confronted with the publication of an interview he had given previously that summer in which he had confirmed that while at Peterhouse, Cambridge he had had homosexual affairs.

Portillo was selected as Conservative candidate but faced demonstrations organised by gay rights group OutRage! and its principal campaigner Peter Tatchell who protested against his vote for an unequal age of consent for gay and straight sex, and support for the ban on homosexuality in the UK armed forces while Secretary of State for Defence. Tatchell continued to try to confront Portillo throughout the election, not assuaged by Portillo saying that he had changed his mind on the age of consent.

The Labour Party selected Robert Atkinson, who had fought the 1997 election and was a local councillor. The Liberal Democrats also renominated their general election candidate, Robert Woodthorpe Browne. Because of the prominence of the byelection in central London and the big political name, there were a wide variety of fringe and minor party candidates. Polling day was set for 25 November. Michael Portillo returned safely to Parliament.

Results

General Election result, 1997

See also
Lists of United Kingdom by-elections

References

External links
Campaign literature from the by-election

Kensington and Chelsea,1999
Kensington and Chelsea,1999
Kensington and Chelsea by-election
Kensington and Chelsea by-election
Kensington and Chelsea by-election
20th century in the Royal Borough of Kensington and Chelsea